Rae is a surname and given name.

Notable people with the surname include:

People (surname)
Alex Rae (disambiguation)
Allen Rae (1932–2016), Canadian basketball referee
Ann Cuthbert Rae (1788–1860), Scottish-born Canadian writer and educator
Ashly Rae, Scottish actress, model and TV presenter
Bob Rae (born 1948), Canadian politician
Cath Rae (born 1985), Scottish field hockey goalkeeper
Charlotte Rae, American actress and singer
Corinne Bailey Rae (born 1979), British songwriter and singer
Dawn Rae (born 1941), Australian cricketer
Divini Rae, motivational speaker, fitness personality and entrepreneur
Douglas Rae (businessman) (1931–2018), Scottish businessman
Douglas Rae (TV executive) (born 1947), Scottish television executive and former presenter
Douglas W. Rae (born 1939), political scientist
Gavin Rae (born 1977), Scottish footballer
Gwynedd Rae (1892–1977), British children's author
Ian Rae (1933–2005), Scottish footballer
Issa Rae (born 1985), American actress
Iso Rae (1860–1940), Australian impressionist painter
Jack Rae (1919–2007), New Zealand flying ace of the Second World War
Jackie Rae (1922–2006), Canadian singer and songwriter
Jasmine Rae (born 1987), Australian singer and songwriter
Jason Rae (born 1986), American political activist
John Rae (administrator) (1813–1900), Australian administrator, painter and author
John Rae (biographer) (1845–1915), Scottish journalist and biographer of Adam Smith
John Rae (economist) (1796–1872), Scottish economist and author of Statement of Some New Principles on the Subject of Political Economy
John Rae (educator) (1931–2006), English novelist, journalist and headmaster
John Rae (explorer) (1813–1893), Scottish explorer of the Arctic
John B. Rae (1838–1922), American labour leader in 1890s
Lou Rae, Australian author and historian
Nelson Rae (1915–1945), American radio and stage actor
Robin Rae (born 1964), Scottish footballer
Stephen Rae (footballer) (born 1952), Australian Rules footballer
Stephen Rae (composer) (born 1961), Australian composer
Stephen Rae (editor) (born 1960s), Irish news editor
Thomas Rae (1819–1862), Australian manufacturer and politician
Tony Rae (1927–2000), Australian educator
Zac Rae, American musician

English-language surnames